Gjorgji Tanušev (Macedonian: Ѓopѓи Taнушeв, born 7 January 1991) is a Macedonian football midfielder playing for Macedonian Second Football League club FK Sileks.

Club career
Born in Strumica, Macedonia, he had started playing with local club FK Belasica before moving to Serbia in summer 2010 to sign with a newly promoted Serbian SuperLiga side FK Sloboda Point Sevojno, a club that was renamed that summer after being known as FK Sloboda Užice and merged with FK Sevojno and taking their spot in the promotion to the top Serbian league. In beginning of the 2011–12 season the clubs restored his former name.  Tanušev moved in summer 2012 to Serbian First League side FK Proleter Novi Sad.

International career
While still playing with FK Belasica, Tanušev has been part of the Macedonian U-17 team and since 2010 has been a member of the Macedonian U-19 team and in March 2011 he made his debut for the Macedonian U-21 team.

References

External sources
 Gjorgji Tanušev Stats at Utakmica.rs

1991 births
Living people
Sportspeople from Strumica
Association football midfielders
Macedonian footballers
North Macedonia youth international footballers
North Macedonia under-21 international footballers
FK Belasica players
FK Sloboda Užice players
FK Proleter Novi Sad players
FK Kolubara players
FK Horizont Turnovo players
FK Bregalnica Štip players
FK Sileks players
FK Borec players
FK Pobeda players
Akademija Pandev players
FK Pelister players
Macedonian First Football League players
Serbian SuperLiga players
Serbian First League players
Macedonian Second Football League players
Macedonian expatriate footballers
Expatriate footballers in Serbia
Macedonian expatriate sportspeople in Serbia